The 1978–79 Oklahoma Sooners men's basketball team represented the University of Oklahoma in competitive college basketball during the 1978–79 NCAA Division I season. The Oklahoma Sooners men's basketball team played its home games in the Lloyd Noble Center and was a member of the National Collegiate Athletic Association's (NCAA) former Big Eight Conference at that time.  The team posted a 21–10 overall record and a 10–4 conference record to finish first in the Conference for head coach Dave Bliss.  This was the only Big Eight Conference Regular Season Championship for Bliss.

The team was led by Big Eight Conference Men's Basketball Player of the Year John McCullough. Despite losing two of three games in the Big Eight Conference Pre-Season Tournament, the team posted a 10–4 record during the conference regular season and won all three of its games during the Big Eight Conference Post-Season Tournament.  Because of the conference tournaments, the team played both Kansas and  four times.  It swept the season series with Kansas State and split the season series with Kansas. The team also played  three times, only winning the home game.  The team reached the sweet sixteen round of the 1979 NCAA Division I basketball tournament by beating Texas before losing to Indiana State.

The Sooners' appearance in the 1979 NCAA Tournament marked their first participation in the event since 1947.

Schedule

|-
!colspan=9 style=| Regular season

|-
!colspan=9 style=| Big Eight Conference Tournament

|-
!colspan=9 style=| NCAA Tournament

Honors
Big Eight POY: John McCullough

Team players drafted into the NBA
The following players were drafted in the 1979 NBA Draft:

The following letter winners from this team were drafted in the NBA Draft in subsequent years (all in the 1980 NBA Draft): Terry Stotts (2nd, 38th, Houston Rockets), Al Beal (3rd, 63rd Milwaukee Bucks), and Aaron Curry (5th, 98th, New Jersey Nets).

See also
Oklahoma Sooners men's basketball
List of Oklahoma Sooners Men's Basketball Conference Championships
1979 NCAA Division I basketball tournament

References

Oklahoma Sooners men's basketball seasons
Oklahoma
Oklahoma